Kataysky (masculine), Katayskaya (feminine), or Katayskoye (neuter) may refer to:

Kataysky District, a district of Kurgan Oblast, Russia
Katayskoye, a rural locality (a village) in Nizhny Novgorod Oblast, Russia